Sepp Ketterer (11 February 1899 in Altglashütten – 11 January 1991) was a German-born Austrian cinematographer. He was involved in the cinematography of almost 50 films between 1938 and 1968.

He worked on a number of Austrian films such as 1. April 2000 which was released in 1952.

Selected filmography
 The White Dream (1943)
 The Fourth Commandment (1950)
 Grandstand for General Staff (1953)
 Goetz von Berlichingen (1955)
 The Blue Danube (1955)
 The King of Bernina (1957)
 Twelve Girls and One Man (1959)
 Crime Tango (1960)
 Bombs on Monte Carlo (1960)
 The Adventures of Count Bobby (1961)
 Three Men in a Boat (1961)
 The Model Boy (1963)
 In Bed by Eight (1965)
 Count Bobby, The Terror of The Wild West (1966)

External links
 

Film people from Baden-Württemberg
Austrian cinematographers
1899 births
1991 deaths
People from Breisgau-Hochschwarzwald